Abdulmohsen Fallatah (born 14 June 1994) is a Saudi Arabian professional footballer who currently plays as a center back for Al-Tai.

Career
On 6 July 2022, Fallatah joined Al-Tai on a free transfer following the expiration of his contract with Al-Ittihad.

References

External links
 

Living people
1994 births
Sportspeople from Mecca
Association football defenders
Saudi Arabian footballers
Saudi Arabia youth international footballers
Al-Wehda Club (Mecca) players
Al-Qadsiah FC players
Ittihad FC players
Al-Tai FC players
Saudi Professional League players